Vis a vis: El Oasis is a Spanish television series starring Maggie Civantos and Najwa Nimri, presented both as spin-off and as 5th and final season of the television series Vis a vis (Locked Up). The plot focuses on the relationship between two characters of the former, Maca and Zulema, after getting out of prison. It aired in 2020 on FOX España.

Premise 
Macarena and Zulema decide to organize one last big heist in order to steal a diamond tiara from the daughter of a Mexican drug trafficker so they team up with Goya, Triana and La Flaca (the "Equipo V"). However, the plan does not exactly come up as expected.

Cast 
Main 
 Najwa Nimri as Zulema Zahir, "el elfo del infierno"
 Maggie Civantos as Macarena "Maca" Ferreiro Molina, "la rubia"
 Itziar Castro as Goya Fernández, "la gordi "
  as Triana Azcoitia, "la hacker"
  as "la flaca"
  as Mónica Ramala
 David Ostrosky as Víctor Ramala
 Ana María Picchio as Ama Castro
Recurring
 Alma Itzel as Kati Ramala
 Almagro San Miguel as Diego "Dieguito" Ramala
  as Cepo Sandoval Castro
 Pablo Vázquez as Julián.
 Natalia Hernández as Elena.
 Paula Gallego as Vivi.
 José de la Torre
 .
 Fernando Sansegundo
 Lolo Diego as Apolo
 Ismael Palacios as Lucas
Special collaboration
 Alba Flores as Saray Vargas de Jesús.
  as Carlos Sandoval Castro
 Georgina Amorós as Fátima Amin
  as Inspector Damián Castillo
Guest
 Mat Cruz as David
 Quique Medina as Acosador
  as Funcionario de Cruz del Norte
 Martina Pérez as Martina
 Guillermo Bedward as Eric

Production and release 
The series was presented by FOX España both as spin-off and as fifth and final season of the television series Vis a vis (Locked Up). Created by Iván Escobar, the screenplay was authored by Lucía Carballal, J. M. Ruiz Córdoba and Escobar himself, whereas the episodes were directed by Sandra Gallego and Miguel Ángel Vivas.

Produced by FOX Networks Group España and Globomedia (The Mediapro Studio), filming took place in between the province of Almería and Madrid. Shooting locations included Agua Amarga, Cabo de Gata and the Tabernas desert. The first episode premiered on 20 April 2020. The broadcasting run of the eight-part series ended on 8 June 2020.

Awards and nominations 

|-
| align = "center" | 2021 || 71st Fotogramas de Plata || Best Television Actress || Maggie Civantos ||  || 
|}

References 

Television shows filmed in Spain
2020 Spanish television series debuts
2020 Spanish television series endings
2020s Spanish drama television series
Spanish thriller television series
Spanish crime television series
Spanish-language television shows
Spanish action television series
Television series by Globomedia